The III Conference of Heads of State and Government of the CPLP, commonly known as the 3rd CPLP Summit (III Cimeira da CPLP) was the 3rd biennial meeting of heads of state and heads of government of the Community of Portuguese Language Countries, held in Maputo, Mozambique, on 17-18 July 2000.

Outcome
The Defense Component of the CPLP is established with the creation of Exercício Felino.

Timor Leste, under United Nations Transitional Administration after 24 years of Indonesian occupation, began the formal proceedings in becoming a full member of the CPLP during this summit. It achieved membership in 2002.

Executive Secretary
Brazilian diplomat Dulce Pereira was elected as the Executive Secretary of the Community of Portuguese Language Countries, succeeding two-term holder Marcolino Moco, former Prime Minister of Angola.

References

External links
CPLP Summits official site

CPLP Summits